The Dress (Swedish: Klänningen) is a 1964 Swedish drama film directed by Vilgot Sjöman and starring Gunn Wållgren, Gunnar Björnstrand and Tina Hedström. It was shot at the Råsunda Studios in Stockholm. The film's sets were designed by the art director Bibi Lindström.

Cast
 Gunn Wållgren as Helen Fürst
 Gunnar Björnstrand as Helmer Berg
 Tina Hedström as 	Edit Fürst
 Mimi Pollak as Mrs. Rubin
 Lars-Erik Berenett as 	Delivery Man 
 Conny Borg as Young Man 
 Fillie Lyckow as 	Saleswoman 
 Ellika Mann as 	Saleswoman
 Berit Tancred as 	Saleswoman

References

Bibliography 
 Larsson, Mariah. A Cinema of Obsession: The Life and Work of Mai Zetterling. University of Wisconsin Pres, 2020.

External links 
 

1964 films
Swedish drama films
1964 drama films
1960s Swedish-language films
Films directed by Vilgot Sjöman
1960s Swedish films